Ovaska is a Finnish surname. Notable people with the surname include:

Asta Ovaska (born 1963), Finnish shot putter
Jouni Ovaska (born 1986), Finnish politician
Toivo Ovaska (1899–1966), Finnish speed skater

Finnish-language surnames